The men's high jump event at the 2022 African Championships in Athletics was held on 12 June in Port Louis, Mauritius.

Results

References

2022 African Championships in Athletics
High jump at the African Championships in Athletics